Flight 736 may refer to:

United Airlines Flight 736, crashed on 21 April 1958
Allegheny Airlines Flight 736, crashed on 24 December 1968

0736